The 1945 Boston University Terriers football team was an American football team that represented Boston University as an independent during the 1945 college football season. In its first and only season under head coach Robert McKelvey, the team compiled a 0–5 record, was shut out in four of five games, and was outscored by a total of 235 to 3.

Schedule

References

Boston University
Boston University Terriers football seasons
College football winless seasons
Boston University Terriers football